State Highway 198 (SH 198) is a  state highway in Henderson, Kaufman, Van Zandt counties in Texas, United States, that runs between Malakoff and Canton. SH 198 was designated in 1933, and its current routing was established in 1983.

Route description

History
SH 198 was originally designated on August 15, 1933, from Canton to Mabank. On January 21, 1936, it was extended to Corsicana. On October 6, 1943, this extension was canceled. On May 19, 1983, it was extended south to Malakoff, replacing part of FM 90.

Major intersections

See also

 List of state highways in Texas
 List of highways numbered 198

References

External links

198
Transportation in Henderson County, Texas
Transportation in Kaufman County, Texas
Transportation in Van Zandt County, Texas